Goli Soda 2 is a 2018 Indian Tamil language action drama film written and directed by Vijay Milton. Sequel to 2015 film Goli Soda, the film stars Samuthirakani, Gautham Vasudev Menon, Barath Seeni, Vinoth, Esakki Barath, with Subiksha, Krisha Kurup, Rakshitha, Chemban Vinod Jose, Saravana Subbiah and Stun Siva playing supporting roles. The film received mixed reviews. The movie was released on June 14 coinciding with Eid-ul Fitr

Cast 

Samuthirakani as Natesan
Gautham Vasudev Menon as Raghavan
Barath Seeni as Maaran
Vinoth as Siva
Esakki Barath as Oli
Subiksha as Innocent Inba
Krisha Kurup as Mathi
Rakshitha as Abhinaya
Chemban Vinod Jose as Thillai
Saravana Subbiah as Dhanasekaran
Stun Siva as Seema Raja
Rohini as Revathi Krishna, Inbavalli's mother
Rekha as Seetha Kumari, Siva's mother
R. S. G. Chelladurai as Chelladurai, Abhinaya's father
E. Ramdoss as Rajendran
Vincent Selva as Vincent
Besant Ravi as Assault Ravi
Radha as Jyothilakshmi
Muthu Azhagarsamy as Saamy
Nagulan as Mariadoss
Mippu as Pritish
Esakki Sundar as Ramasundaram
Ahanya as Tanmai
Thomas as Kumar
Udhaya Sudhakar as Rajamurugan
Cuddalore Manimaran as Mani
Sridhar in a special appearance ("Pondatte")

Soundtrack

Reception 
Behindwoods rated the film 2.5 out of 5 and stated, "Though refreshing, this Goli Soda could have been lip-smacking if not for a few forced moments". Indiaglitz gave 2.75 out of 5 and stated, "Vijay Milton has photographed, written and directed the film keeping it engaging and entertaining in most parts. Where he has let himself down compared to the original gem is taking too many cinematic liberties in this one". M. Suganth of The Times of India gave 3 out of 5 and wrote, "Despite a riveting first half, Goli Soda 2 falls short when compared to the first film". Ashameera Aiyappan of The Indian Express gave 2 out of 5 and said, "Post interval, the movie moves in a predictable manner with forced hard to believe over-the-top action sequences" . Anupama Subramanian of Deccan Chronicle gave 2.5 out of 5 and said, "Post interval, the movie moves in a predictable manner with forced hard to believe over-the-top action sequences" and concluded, "the fizz which was intact in the first part is somewhat missing in Goli Soda 2".

References

External links 
 

2018 films
2018 action drama films
Indian action drama films
Indian sequel films
2010s Tamil-language films